The 2004 Asian Badminton Championships was the 23rd edition of the Asian Badminton Championships. It was held in Kuala Lumpur, Malaysia from April 20 to April 25, 2004.

Medalists

Medal table

Final Results

Men's singles

Women's singles

Men's doubles

Women's doubles

Mixed doubles

References 
http://tournamentsoftware.com/sport/events.aspx?id=C3F92BA1-260A-484C-92CA-665738118DB0 tournamentsoftware.com

https://www.badmintoncentral.com/forums/index.php?threads/abc-2004-results.15189/page-3

https://www.badmintoncentral.com/forums/index.php?threads/abc-2004-results.15189/page-4

External links
 Draws and results - BadmintonAsia.org (.xls)

Badminton Asia Championships
B
Asian Badminton Championships
Asian Badminton Championships
Sport in Kuala Lumpur
Asian Badminton Championships